Modern historians' knowledge of ancient Roman gynecology and obstetrics primarily comes from Soranus of Ephesus' four-volume treatise on gynecology. His writings covered medical conditions such as uterine prolapse and cancer and treatments involving materials such as herbs and tools such as pessaries. Ancient Roman doctors believed that menstruation was designed to rid the female body of excess fluids. They believed that menstrual blood had special powers. Roman doctors may also have noticed conditions such as premenstrual syndrome.

Techniques

Uterine prolapse 
Uterine prolapse is a medical condition in which the uterus extends towards the vaginal opening. It is possible that this condition was the origin of the belief that the womb could move around. Ancient Roman gynecologists treated this condition by suspending the patient upside down from a ladder. This treatment was not universally accepted by ancient Roman doctors. Soranus of Ephesus criticized this treatment method. Another treatment at the time involved wrapping aetites, which were magic stones used to protect the fetus and ease childbirth, in the skin of sacrificed animals. The only known mention of a hysterectomy comes from the work Gynecology. Soranus writes that a woman with an inverted uterus infected with gangrene had her uterus and bladder removed.

Abortion and incontinence 
There were surgical procedures for abortion in ancient Rome, but they were rarely used, and most abortions were conducted using herbs or other drugs. When surgery was used, it involved the usage of surgical instruments to penetrate the mother. Usually, this procedure ended with both the fetus' and the mother's death. Soranus of Ephesus wrote that purging, carrying heavy weights, and the injection of olive oil into the vagina or uterus, were all procedures used to carry out abortions. Ancient Roman doctors, including Soranus, believed that abortion was forbidden by the Hippocratic Oath, which forbade giving a woman "a pessary to cause abortion". According to Soranus, the only exception was when pregnancy threatened the life of the mother. Both Galen, a Greek doctor, and Hippocrates described the usage of pelvic floor muscle training, now known as Kegel exercises, to treat urinary incontinence. These techniques were theorized to be beneficial for one's physical, spiritual, and sexual health.

Menstrual cycle 

Ancient Roman doctors such as Aetius believed that amenorrhea, or the absence of a menstrual cycle, was caused by a "hot temperament". Soranus noticed psychosomatic causes of this condition; in this scenario he advised no treatment. He also believed that this condition could be caused by a lack of a feminine body, he recommended restricted food intake to try and reshape the body. Some foods and medications used to treat this condition were cucumbers, grapes, and wine. It could also be treated with an incision into the hymen. This therapy was also used to treat dysmenorrhea, which the Romans called "retention of the menstrual flux". It is a menstrual disorder characterized by pelvic, abdominal, or back pain resulting from menstruation. Chamomile is a type of daisy-like plant that ancient Roman woman used to treat dysmenorrhea. Venipuncture through leeches was another kind of treatment for this disorder. In ancient Rome, women with heavy menstrual bleeding would be treated by applying ligatures to the groin and to the armpits, thus blocking off blood flow throughout the body. It was theorized this also resulted in the reduction of blood flow to the uterus. Following this, blunt corks, liquid pitch, and pessaries soaked with alum, plant sap, or the yolk of roasted eggs were inserted inside the vagina.

Cancer 
Ancient Roman physicians noticed that breast cancer and ovarian cancer occurred more frequently in some families than others. Galen believed that menstruation would rid a woman of their black bile, and therefore could cure melancholia, which is a historical term for depression. Galen concluded that menopause, or the cessation of the menstrual cycle, would lead to an excess of black bile and therefore breast cancer. The treatment for breast cancer consisted of bloodletting and cupping therapy. Aulus Celsus described  the stages of breast cancer in his treatise De Medicina. In the first stage, when the cancer was limited to a lesion, caustics were used, followed by an incision, then cauterization. This stage was called cacoethes. Celsus considered this treatment effective only in the early stages. During the later ones it was thought to merely hasten the patient's death. While Celsus did not advocate for the removal of the pectoral muscles, Galen believed the only way to get rid of breast cancer was to excise all infected regions from the body. Cervical cancer was believed to be a disease that primarily affected married women, widows, and prostitutes. It was also believed that nuns and virgins would remain unaffected. The Romans' association between cervical cancer and frequent sexual intercourse may have been because a virus known as human papillomavirus is known to cause cervical cancer and is sexually transmitted.

Caesarean sections 
During a Roman Caesarean section, the doctors would make an incision into the abdomen and uterus of the mother. Following this, the baby was removed. This practice could also be conducted on dead mothers in order to remove the babies from their corpses. It was rare for doctors to perform this operation, as it had a high mortality rate. According to Roman religion the god Asclepius was born through a Caesarian section. Roman historians Suetonius and Pliny the Elder also record Julius Caesar as being born by Caesarian section. However, the veracity of these claims is debated.

Scientific understanding

Menstruation 
Ancient Greek and Roman gynecologists believed that women were naturally more prone to humoral imbalance and therefore illness. For example, women were more likely to become "moist". It was believed that the female body had more water than the male body. Ancient doctors thought that puberty, specifically the menarche, could be caused through an excess of fluid buildup in the female body, and thus menstruation was the body's way of regulating its fluid and humoral balance. This idea led to Roman doctors not taking notice of problematic menstrual cycles; excessive and minimal menstruation were medical problems noticed by doctors. Pliny the Elder, a Roman naturalist, wrote that menstrual fluid could wither fruit, cause insanity in dogs, dull mirrors, rust iron and bronze, kill bees, pollute purple fabrics, cause miscarriages in horses and humans, and sour crops. He also believed that if a woman menstruated during a solar or lunar eclipse, sexual intercourse could result in death. Pliny also stated that the touch of a menstruating woman could treat medical conditions such as gout, fevers, erysipelas, scrofula, skin cancer, and bites from rabid dogs. Aside from medicinal uses, Pliny listed a number of supernatural uses. For example, magi could not perform any magic feats if their doorsteps had been touched by menstrual blood. It was also believed that menstrual fluid could contaminate entrances, and therefore households.

Vaginal bleeding and discharge 
Vaginal bleeding is the expulsion of blood from the vagina. Galen described a woman suffering from this condition, or what he described as the "female flux". Other names for this condition included the "abnormal flux", "menstrual flux", and "hemorrhage of the uterus". Juvenal was a Roman poet notable for his Satires. In these works, he occasionally described what we know to be vaginal discharge, which is the collection of cells, bacteria, and liquid used to protect and lubricate the vagina. He wrote about a "great torrent of sheer lust" running down a woman's legs at the idea of engaging in "energetic" interactions with a man. Juvenal also stated that "No woman will say no to her moist vulva", and he describes an adulteress coming home with a fluid on her dress, possibly semen or vaginal discharge.

Premenstrual syndrome 
Modern doctors define premenstrual syndrome as a syndrome resulting in several abnormalities in women before menstruation. These abnormalities consist of symptoms such as irritability and mood changes. Ancient Roman doctors may have noticed this disease in women. They stated that menstruation occurs all at once in a specific moment each month, it is possible this theory was designed to account for the syndrome.

Childbirth 
Childbirth in ancient Rome had a high mortality rate for the mothers. Modern estimates are that 17 women died in childbirth for every 1,000 births. It is possible that this was due to the young age of marriage in Rome. Roman doctors believed that the fetus could be injured through a "faulty fetus". Ancient gynecologists also thought that the fetus could harm the mother's health. Hippocrates divided gestation into forty-day periods. The first period represented the time where the risk of miscarriage was the highest, the last forty days was when the fetus was the most active. Soranus wrote that during pregnancy women began craving to eat materials such as charcoal. Amulets and other magical items were used to ensure the mother would give birth on time.

See also 
 Medicine in ancient Rome

References

History of medicine
Ancient Roman medicine
History of anatomy
Gynaecology
Women in ancient Rome